The Patchwork Girl (a.k.a. Scraps) is a character from the fantasy Oz Book series by L. Frank Baum. She first appeared in The Patchwork Girl of Oz.

History

Scraps is a living rag doll made of patchwork, button eyes, brown yarn hair, a felt tongue, and pearl teeth. She was originally brought to life by a Munchkin magician named Dr. Pipt by means of his Powder of Life formula to be a servant for his wife Margolotte. Ojo overloaded her with magic brains in the process of bringing her to life, and as she happily jumped around she accidentally spilled the Liquid of Petrifaction on Mrs. Pipt and Ojo's uncle, consequently turning them to stone. Much of their first adventure is gathering the ingredients to find a counterspell.

She later became the companion of the Scarecrow who found her quite beautiful.

She had major roles in such Oz books as The Gnome King of Oz and The Wonder City of Oz, and was the title character in A Runaway in Oz.

The Patchwork Girl was likely influenced by the character of Topsy in Uncle Tom's Cabin, and she may have influenced the character of Raggedy Ann.

Scraps in other media
Despite her popularity, to the point that her image was used in at least two advertisements for student desks, she has appeared in only five film productions, two of which were made for television.  When Baum produced a film version of the title story, he was not able to find a woman of athleticism suitable to play the role, and therefore cast the male French acrobat Pierre Couderc.  She was portrayed by Doreen Tracy on the 4th Anniversary episode of Disneyland.

Patchwork Girl appears in Return to Oz. She is seen in the background at Princess Ozma's coronation.

On The Oz Kids, she was voiced by Lori Alan and had numerous infant patchwork kids.  She also appeared in Walter Murch's Return to Oz as an unbilled extra. Thundertoad Animation's comparatively primitive CGI version from 2005 featured Cyndi Hotopp in the title role.

There were at least two versions of the above-mentioned advertisement, a classroom poster issued by American Seating Company. They were not bootlegs and were authorized by the publishers. They include the statement "These quaint characters are quoted from the famous Oz books and were created by L. Frank Baum. Used by permission of Reilly and Lee Company, the publishers." However this appears in very fine print and is easy to miss, especially on a small photo or reproduction of the poster. An earlier version of the poster is printed mostly in green and orange, a later version has more colors. A picture of a girl sitting at a desk in the lower right corner is also different in these two versions.

Scraps stood alongside her friends when they rallied against a "new" Witch trying to obliterate the entirety of Oz in the comic book The Oz/Wonderland Chronicles.

The Patchwork Girl also appeared in a leading role in the unaired television pilot Lost in Oz. In this version, her name is Serena and it is implied that she was once human. After her best friend became the new Wicked Witch of the West, she was literally ripped apart, but later repaired by an unknown person. The Witch also killed her family, and for this she has sworn vengeance against her former friend. Physically, she is very different from her book counterpart. She is extremely athletic, and looks like a pale human with dark hair.  However, after her outfit is damaged, it is revealed that she is made of fabric underneath. The actress also portrayed the best friend of the heroine, Alex, at the beginning of the episode, a nod to the 1939 film in which Dorothy's comrades were portrayed by her friends.

In Emerald City Confidential, she owns a general store located next to Petra's office. She is also part of Frogman's smuggling ring.

In Talking With..., the second monologue is about a housewife who dresses up as Scraps to escape her mundane life.

Patchwork Girl is a supporting character in Dorothy and the Wizard of Oz, voiced by Jessica DiCicco. Just like the books, Scarecrow found her quite beautiful.

References

Oz (franchise) characters
Fictional dolls and dummies
Literary characters introduced in 1913
Female characters in literature
Rag dolls
Teenage characters in literature
Sentient toys in fiction